Fort Churchill and Sand Springs Toll Road was opened in 1866.

A segment of the toll road within Churchill County, Nevada is listed on the National Register of Historic Places on November 24, 1974. This segment allowed a team of 18 mules to pull three heavily laden freight wagons across a mountain.  One end of the road was located at Fort Churchill.

Running between Dayton and the former Sand Springs Pony Express Station along US 50 east of Fallon, the route provided a reliable supply route from the Comstock, Carson City and California to the Reese River Mining District centered in Austin.

Sources 
Nevada Department of Museums, Library and Arts

References 

Transportation in Churchill County, Nevada
National Register of Historic Places in Churchill County, Nevada
Roads on the National Register of Historic Places in Nevada